The Scarbrough Building is a historic commercial building in downtown Austin, Texas. Located on the corner of Congress Avenue and Sixth Street, the Chicago-style building was originally home to the flagship E.M. Scarbrough & Sons department store. The building was the first steel-framed high-rise in Austin. In 1931, a renovation introduced Art Deco elements to the building; the renovation also made Scarbrough's the first retailer to have air conditioning (“manufactured weather”) west of the Mississippi River. The building was named a Recorded Texas Historic Landmark in 2001.

History
The building was originally built starting in 1908 by Emerson Monroe Scarbrough, Sr., a former Confederate soldier, to house the flagship location for E.M. Scarbrough & Sons department store, which was known as Scarbrough's by locals. The store originally opened in 1874 in Rockdale, Texas under the name Scarbrough & Hicks. In 1893 Scarbrough left R.H. Hicks in charge of the store and moved with his family to Austin, expanding the business to a new location in the Kreisle Building at the 400 block of Congress Avenue. In 1905, Scarbrough hired architects Sanguinet & Staats to design a new building for the department store. When the new building was completed in 1909, it was the tallest in the state, but George W. Littlefield added a ninth story to his new building to steal the title a year later. In an era where goods were bargained, Scarbrough's was a pioneer in price tagging every item in the store.

E.M. Scarbrough bought out and renamed the business with his sons, J. William and Lemuel Scarbrough, in 1913. In 1931, the Scarbrough sons hired architects Wyatt C. Hedrick and Edwin C. Kreisle for a renovation of the building. The Scarbrough Building was completely remodeled in an Art Deco facade, with shop windows widened from 6 ft. (2 m). In its heyday, the department store occupied 95,000 sq. ft. (8,800 m2) spanning three stories, including 10 departments on the ground floor alone.

Growth after World War II would redefine shopping habits among the city's new residents. In the 1970s, a branch store was opened at Highland Mall. In 1981, a Scarbrough's store opened as an anchor at Barton Creek Square. The struggling downtown store closed its doors in 1982 after dismal Christmas season sales. The last remaining Scarbrough's store, located on North Lamar Boulevard, closed its doors in December 2009.

After Scarbrough's department store closed, the building's ground floor and basement were home to numerous retail stores, including Brooks Brothers and Gold's Gym. In 2019, it was announced that Punch Bowl Social, an entertainment venue, signed a lease for the ground floor and basement level of the building.

Gallery

References

Buildings and structures in Austin, Texas
Defunct department stores based in Texas
Sanguinet & Staats buildings
Recorded Texas Historic Landmarks
Chicago school architecture in Texas
Art Deco architecture in Texas